Sombrin is a commune in the Pas-de-Calais department in the Hauts-de-France region of France.

Geography

Population

Places of interest
 Ruins of a sixteenth-century chateau.
 The church of St. Vaast, also dating from the sixteenth century.

See also
 Communes of the Pas-de-Calais department

References

Communes of Pas-de-Calais